is a Japanese actor and tarento represented by Amuse, Inc.

Filmography

TV series

Films

Stage

TV series

Advertisements

Music videos

References

External links
 

Japanese male film actors
Japanese male stage actors
Japanese male television actors
Japanese male child actors
Japanese entertainers
1999 births
Living people
Amuse Inc. talents
21st-century Japanese singers
21st-century Japanese male singers